The Royal Sites are a set of palaces, monasteries, and convents built for and under the patronage of the Spanish monarchy. They are administered by Patrimonio Nacional (National Heritage), a Spanish state agency; most are open to the public, at least in part, except when they are needed for state or official events.

Here is a list of the Patrimonio Nacional royal sites, with the provinces where they are located.

Royal palaces 
 Royal Palace of Madrid (Madrid) (official residence of the King)
 Royal Seat of San Lorenzo de El Escorial (Royal Castle & Monastery of El Escorial (Madrid)
 Royal Palace of El Pardo (Madrid)
 Palace of Zarzuela (Madrid) (de facto residence of the King and Royal Family, part of the larger El Pardo complex)
 Royal Palace of Aranjuez (Madrid)

 Royal Palace of La Granja de San Ildefonso (Segovia)
 Royal Palace of Riofrío (Segovia)
 Royal Palace of La Almudaina (Palma de Mallorca, Balearic Islands)

Royal convents and monasteries 
 Convent of Las Descalzas Reales (Madrid)
 Royal Convent of La Encarnación (Madrid)
 Royal Convent of Santa Clara (Valladolid)
 Abbey of Santa Maria la Real de Huelgas (Burgos)
 Benedictine Abbey of Santa Cruz del Valle de los Caídos (Madrid)

Sanctuaries under royal patronage 
 Pantheon of Illustrious Men (Madrid)
 Convent of San Pascual (Madrid)
 Convent of Santa Isabel (Madrid)
 Colegio de Doncellas Nobles (Toledo)

Other royal sites residences 
These current or historical royal residences are well known but are not administered by Patrimonio Nacional:
 Royal Alcázar of Seville under the care of Patronato del Real Alcázar de Sevilla.
 Royal Alcázar of Segovia, administered by the Patronato del Alcázar de Segovia
 Albéniz Palace (the King's official residence in Catalonia) in the city of Barcelona, under the care of Generalitat of Catalonia.
 Marivent Palace (the King's summer residence) in Palma de Mallorca, under the care of Government of the Balearic Islands.
 Valladolid Royal Palace (Valladolid, Castile)
 Royal Residence of La Mareta (Lanzarote, Canary Islands)
 San Jeronimo el Real, Church/Monastery, Madrid

Former royal palaces 
 Alcázar of Segovia
 Alhambra
 Aljafería
 Buen Retiro Palace
 Castle Alcázar of Segorbe
 Castle of Bellver
 Castle of Burgos
 Del Real Palace
 Generalife
 Palace of Charles V
 Palacio de la Ribera
 Palau Reial de Pedralbes
 Palau Reial Major
 Royal Alcazar of Madrid
 Royal Palace of Olite
 Palace of la Magdalena
 Miramar Palace
 Palace of Valsain
 Royal Palace of Valladolid
 Torre de la Parada

External links
 Patrimonio Nacional

Spanish monarchy
Palaces in Spain
 
Historical Patrimony of Spain
Lists of royal residences
Spain